The Colonial States College Hockey Conference (CSCHC) is a non-varsity club college ice hockey league based in the mid-Atlantic region of the United States. The conference is part of the American Collegiate Hockey Association Division 2 and is made up of ten teams from colleges and universities based in New Jersey and Pennsylvania.

History 

The conference was formed on April 14, 2014, by programs previously associated with the Great Northeast Collegiate Hockey Conference (GNCHC). The original seven members consisted of Millersville University, New Jersey Institute of Technology (NJIT), Princeton University, Seton Hall University, The College of New Jersey (TCNJ), the University of Pennsylvania, and West Chester University. The founder and first president of the conference was Tom Hench (2014-2016). Andrew Ducko took over as president from 2016 to 2022. Sal Capone currently resides as the conference president (2022–present).

Prior to the 2015–16 season Monmouth University joined the conference from the Mid-Atlantic Collegiate Hockey Association (MACH), raising the total number of teams to eight. In November 2015, the ACHA granted the CSCHC an automatic bid into the ACHA D2 Regional Tournament.

In March 2016, Rutgers University and the University of Scranton were accepted into the conference from the GNCHC following the 2015–16 season.

For the 2018–19 season the conference adopted a new shootout rule for regular season games that were tied at the conclusion of overtime, eliminating the "tie" entirely from CSCHC play. Following the season the CSCHC took part in the 2019 Men's Division 2 All Star Challenge, along with 12 other DII leagues and one group representing independent programs, which was hosted at West Chester's Ice Line Quad Rinks. The team finished 12th with a record of 1-3-1. In August 2019, TCNJ was announced as a 2020 ACHA Men's Division 2 Regional host, with Loucks Ice Center in Lawrenceville, New Jersey acting as the site for the Southeast tournament between February 28 and March 1. This was the first time that a team from The Colonial acted as an official host for an official ACHA event. The two teams that advanced to the 2020 National Tournament from this were #3 University of Cincinnati and #7 Miami University. The 2020 ACHA National tournament was later canceled due to the COVID-19 pandemic.

In April 2020, Stockton University was announced at the conference's 11th member ahead of the 2020–21 season (which was eventually canceled due to the COVID-19 pandemic). The Ospreys became the first member to jump into Division 2 with its move, most recently playing in the Delaware Valley Collegiate Hockey Conference's (DVCHC) National Division at the Division 3 level. The team also rejoined the ACHA as the DVCHC, at the time of the 2019–20 season, was playing under the Collegiate Hockey Federation, a separate non-varsity governing body. The next year the league accepted Bryn Athyn College as its 12th member, which had transitioned from playing as an Independent NCAA DIII program to ACHA DII.

The Colonial entered the 2022–23 season with the admission Penn State Berks, its first team to join from ACHA Division 1 (Eastern Collegiate Hockey Association). However the conference also lost members for the first time with the departures of The College of New Jersey, Princeton University, and Monmouth University. With ten teams participating the conference reverted to a single division format.

Notable Achievements

Playoff Format

Original (2014 to 2021), current (2022 to present) 
Teams within the conference play one-another twice a season, once at home and once on the road. The results of these games count towards league standings and determine the playoff seeds. The top six teams at the conclusion of the regular season will qualify for the conference playoffs, which are held at a single venue over the course of one weekend.

The top two seeds receive a bye in the first round. The third seed faces the sixth seed, while the fourth seed faces the fifth. The second round sees the top seed take on the lowest remaining seed, and the second seed take on the second highest seed remaining. The two teams that advance will face each-other in the championship game, with the winner receiving both the conference trophy and a birth in the ACHA Southeast Regional Tournament.

Dual Division Iteration (2021 to 2022)
For the 2021–22 season, the Colonial split its twelve member teams into two divisions. These divisions, named the Liberty and Independence divisions, have individual standings and their own qualification methods into the 2022 Colonial Cup playoffs. Teams in the Liberty Division, the larger of the two groups, play one-another twice, home and away, and play Independence teams once amounting to a 18-game regular season. The four teams within the Independence Division play one-another three times with one additional game against each of the teams in the Liberty Division. This amounts to a 17-game regular season.

Following the conclusion of the regular season a seven-team playoff is hosted. The top six teams in the Liberty Division qualify for the tournament with the school finishing first overall receiving a bye into the semifinals. The seventh seed in the tournament goes to the highest finishing team in the Independence Division. The second seed faces the seventh seed (Independence), while the third faces the sixth and fourth faces the fifth. In the semifinals the first seed plays the lowest seed remaining in the tournament while the other two remaining teams face off. The two teams that advance will face each-other in the championship game.

Member Teams

Conference arenas

Former Members
The College of New Jersey (2014–2022), joined Northeast Collegiate Hockey League (ACHA Division I) in 2022
Princeton University (2014–2022), joined Atlantic Coast Collegiate Hockey League (ACHA Division II) ELITE division in 2022. Princeton has an NCAA Division I Ice Hockey team competing in the ECAC Hockey Conference.
Monmouth University (2015–2022)

Season standings

2014–15 season

2015–16 season

2016–17 season

2017–18 season

2018–19 season

2019–20 season

2020–21 season
 Not played due to the COVID-19 Pandemic

2021–22 season
Liberty Division

Independence Division

2022–23 season

Championship results

Regional bids

See also
American Collegiate Hockey Association
List of ice hockey leagues

Notes

References

ACHA Division 2 conferences
Ice hockey in New Jersey
Ice hockey in Pennsylvania
2014 establishments in the United States